TCDD DE18000 are a type of diesel-electric locomotive built for operations on Turkish State Railways by Matériel de Traction Electrique. The order was a trial for a lighter version of the DE24000, and only five units were delivered. The units were mostly used around Izmir and are now retired with the exception of DE18003 which as of February 2019 was still active in the Izmir area.

History
During the 1970s the Turkish State Railways decided to replace their 800 steam locomotives with diesel. This quite delayed task required the delivery of more than 400 diesel units. On February 15, 1968 TCDD and MTE signed an agreement for delivery of the DE24000 and the DE18000. TCDD opted for the larger Co'Co' engine, and only five were delivered of the smaller Bo'Bo'.

External links
 Trains of Turkey page onDE 18000

Bo-Bo locomotives
Turkish State Railways diesel locomotives
Standard gauge locomotives of Turkey
Railway locomotives introduced in 1970